Gbenga Ogunbote (born in Ogun State, Nigeria) is a Nigerian football coach.

Career
On 12 July 2012 he was appointed to coach Sunshine Stars F.C. He has also managed reputable teams such as Enyimba F.C. and Shooting Stars.

On 30 October 2017 he was announced new coach of Enugu Rangers.

References 
 https://www.completesports.com/remo-stars-appoint-ogunbote-new-head-coach/

External links
Gbenga Ogunbote at Footballdatabase

Living people
Sunshine Stars F.C. managers
Enyimba F.C. managers
Shooting Stars S.C. managers
Nigerian football managers
Rangers International F.C. managers
Year of birth missing (living people)
People from Kebbi State